Neandra is a genus of beetles in the family Cerambycidae, containing the following species:

 Neandra brunnea (Fabricius, 1798)
 Neandra marginicollis (Schaeffer, 1929)

References

Parandrinae